Victoria Tran, known by her ring name Viva Van is an American professional wrestler and model. She is best known for her work on the Independent circuit, wrestling for promotions such as on All Elite Wrestling, Lucha Libre AAA Worldwide, Impact Wrestling, Championship Wrestling from Hollywood, and PCW Ultra.

Van appeared on the Pro Wrestling Illustrated series "Behind the Curtain" in June 2020 where she talked about raising money to fund the construction of a wrestling ring for the first and only pro wrestling school in Vietnam, Vietnam Pro Wrestling (formerly known as Saigon Pro Wrestling Club).

Early life 
Van was born and raised in Los Angeles, California. Growing up Viva was a big fan of Horror Films and Wrestling. Her favorite wrestler was The Undertaker.

Career

Training 
Viva Van was trained by WWE Hall of Fame Inductee Rikishi and Black Pearl of the Anoa'i family and Samoan Dynasty. On an interview with Cultaholic, Van talks about how a car accident lead to her being able to begin her wrestling training, as well as her work with promotions like Lucha Libre AAA. In an interview with Voyage LA, Viva Van talks about the length of her training before making her wrestling debut, as well as challenges she faced along the way like racism, sexism and bullying.

Independent circuit 
Van made her debut into professional wrestling in 2018. Since her debut Viva Van has worked for several promotions in the Independent Circuit. Viva Van was featured on Last Word on Sports, where they discuss her efforts to jumpstart a pro wrestling scene in Vietnam, as well as her work for West Coast Independent Promotions like PCW Ultra, Championship Wrestling from Hollywood, and Hoodslam. Van elaborates on her journey within professional wrestling and how exactly she got in touch with Vietnam Pro Wrestling (FKA Saigon Pro Wrestling Club) in her feature for Inspiring East LA stories for Voyage Magazine. Van was featured on FNX Network's segment, Women's Wrestling Month, where she talked about Professional Wrestling, Death Metal, and her career.

APW / GRPW: Young Lions Cup 
Van competed for the 2019 Young Lions Cup. Viva Defeated Eliza Hammer and Grace Li with her tag team partner Aliyah Mia Sweets in the 1st round. Van then defeated Aliyah Mia Sweets in a singles match in the Semi Final. Viva went on to the final round to compete in a 4-Way Elimination match against AEW's Vance / Number 10 of the Dark Order, Alpha Zo, and Titus alexander.

Expo Lucha 
Viva debuted for Expo Lucha in August 2019. She tag teamed with current WWE Wrestlers Shotzi Blackheart and Taya Valkyrie and defeated Zeda Zhang, Simone Sherie, and Joey Ryan

Future Stars of Wrestling (FSW) 
Viva debuted on Future Stars of Wrestling PPV in April 2021. Van was defeated by CMLL Veteran Estrellita. Van returned on August 22, 2021, where she defeated Jordan Blu in a singles match.

Hoodslam: GLAM! 
Viva Van made her debut in January 2019 in a match against Lady K. Van returned on March 8, 2019, with Shakira Spears to face off against Trish Adora and Heather Monroe. On May 10, 2019, Viva Van teamed up with Rob Hands to wrestle a handicap match against Da Squaaad and ultimately were defeated. June 2019, Viva teamed up with WWE wrestler MVP to and avenged her loss against Da Squad. In 2020 GLAM! Announces the brand new Women's Championship tournament where contenders compete for the title. Viva Van made it to the Semi-Final defeating both Gia Roman and Danika Della Rouge before subsequently losing to Lady K.

Mission Pro Wrestling 
Van made her debut for Thunder Rosa's Mission Pro Wrestling in May 2021 in a Triple Threat match against Impact Wrestler Masha Slamovich and Vipress.

Rise Wrestling 
Van made her debut on Rise Wrestling in May 2019 for their program Luminous. Viva Van defeated wrestler Auntie Hydie in a Dark Match.

Suburban Fight 
Viva made her debut at Suburban Fight Wrestling in October 2019. Van wrestled against undefeated Champion Tuna.

All Elite Wrestling (AEW) 
Viva Van made her debut for AEW Dark on July 6, 2021, in a match against Kris Statlander. Van returned to All Elite Wrestling and was defeated by former AEW Women's Champion Nyla Rose.

Championship Wrestling from Hollywood 
Viva Van wrestled in December 2019 to face off against AEW Wrestler Thunder Rosa where she was defeated in a singles match. Viva made two appearances in March 2021 where she defeated Mylo Matters  and had a Match against Heather Monroe ruled a No Contest. Van returned twice in April 2021 and defeated CeCe Chanel and Heather Monroe in a triple threat match. Viva wrestled again in June 2021 for CWFH Episode 526 to wrestle with Bryn Thorne against Ruby Raze and CeCe Chanel. Raze and Chanel won the match.

On the November 27, 2021 episode of UWN Primetime Live Championship Wrestling from Georgia, she defeated Savanna Stone.

DEFY Wrestling 
Viva Van made her debut for the Defy on August 27, 2021, for their 2-Day Event: Leviathan. where she defeated Rebel Kel in a Singles Match. Van returned on Night 2, where her and Lucha Ghoul were defeated in a Tag-team match against Rosas and Rebel Kel. Viva defeated Vert Vixen at Defy: Dangerous on October 9, 2021. Van returned at Defy: Hell Bent, where she defeated Sandra Moone. Viva retained her PCW Ultra Women's Champion against Allie Katch on October 29, 2021, at Defy: Marauders .

IMPACT! Wrestling 
Van made her debut for Impact Wrestling on March 8, 2019. Viva was defeated in a match against former Impact Knockout's Champion Jessicka Havok.

Lucha Libre AAA 
In May 2019 Van was defeated in a 6-Man Tag Team Match with former WWE NXT Wrestler Jake Atlas, Lady Maravilla, and Kamik-C against Faby Apache, Fantastik, Heather Monroe, and Nino Hamburguesa. March 10, 2020 Viva and Mirage were victorious against Extassis and Juve Venegas. On March 13, 2020, Van wrestled in tag-team with Black Destiny, Fantastik, and Rayo Star against El Poder del Norte (Tito Santana, Carta Brava Jr., and Mocho Cota Jr.) on the AAA vs MLW show.

PCW Ultra 
Viva Van wrestles within the faction Warbeast. As a single's competitor Van challenged for the PCW Ultra Women's Championship against Ring of Honor's Sumie Sakai. Viva returned at PCW Ultra: All Systems Go on October 22, 2021, and defeated Ruby Raze for the PCW Ultra Women's Championship.

Other ventures 
Van is a vocalist of the Southern California heavy metal band Mocking of the Trinity, which participated in the Last.fm: Maidens of Metal show.

Viva modeled regularly for various publications and promotions under the name Victorya Van Tran. Viva was feature in the July 2013 Magazine Petite Alternative. In March 2014 Viva was featured on Tattoo Envy as the centerfold model. June 2014, Van was the cover shot for Wheels & Heels Magazine. May 2015, Viva was Cover Model for Petite Alternative. September 2015, Van was featured again on Wheel & Heels Magazine during Hot Import Nights in San Diego, California. Viva was also featured on the December 2020 issue of Gothic Girl Magazine where she talks about professional wrestling and heavy metal.

Championships and accomplishments 
 Arizona Wrestling Federation
 AWF Women's Championship (1 time)
 Big Time Wrestling
BTW Women's Championship (1 time, current)
 Future Stars Of Wrestling
FSW Women's Championship (1 time, current)
 New Tradition Lucha Libre
NTLL Women's Championship (1 time, current)
 PCW Ultra
PCW Ultra Women's Championship (2 times, current)
 Venue Wrestling Entertainment
VWE Women's Championship (1 time)

References 

American wrestlers
Year of birth missing (living people)
Living people
American female professional wrestlers
Professional wrestlers from California
21st-century American women